Jan Ditlev Hansen (born 26 March 1946 in Trondheim, Norway) is a Norwegian Jazz journalist and program host at the NRK. He is married to Cand.polit Randi Marie Haugland, at University of Tromsø.

Career 
Hansen has been closely involved in northern Norwegian jazz for 40 years. First in the Harstad as secretary and director of Nordnorsk Jazzforum in the early 1970s, then in Vadsø, in which he was master of ceremonies during the first Varangerfestivalen in 1982. Since 1978 he has worked for the Norwegian Broadcasting Corporation, and has made numerous radio and television programs about the northern Norwegian jazz. From 1997 he has been living in Tromsø, where he produces his weekly Rundt midnatt (Around midnight) for the NRK P2. He is also part of the NRK Jazz editorial. Hansen has written journalistic books, articles, and local historical writings, including the jazz.

Honors 
2011: «Stubøprisen»
2013: «Molderosen» at the Moldejazz

Bibliography

References 

1946 births
Norwegian journalists
People from Trondheim
Norwegian music journalists
People from Tromsø
Living people